Malé Uherce is a village and municipality in Partizánske District in the Trenčín Region of western Slovakia.

History
In historical records the village was first mentioned in 1274.

Geography
The municipality lies at an altitude of 200 metres and covers an area of 5.974 km². It has a population of about 728 people.

References

External links

  Official page
https://www.webcitation.org/5QjNYnAux?url=http://www.statistics.sk/mosmis/eng/run.html

Villages and municipalities in Partizánske District